The Crown Lands Act 1702 (1 Ann c 1) is an Act of the Parliament of England, originally entitled An Act for the better Support of Her Majesties Houshold and of the Honour and Dignity of the Crown. The Act was still partly in force in Great Britain at the end of 2010.

Sections 1 to 4 were repealed by the Statute Law Revision Act 1867.

Sections 6 and 8 were repealed by Schedule 1 to the Statute Law Revision Act 1948.

In the Republic of Ireland this Act was repealed by sections 2(1) and 3(1) of, and Part 2 of Schedule 2 to, the Statute Law Revision Act 2007.

See also
Crown Lands Act

References
Halsbury's Statutes,

External links
The Crown Lands Act 1702, as amended from the National Archives.
List of repeals in the Republic of Ireland from the Irish Statute Book

Acts of the Parliament of England
1702 in England
1702 in law